The Cherokee Turnpike is a toll road in eastern Oklahoma. An alternate route, US-412 Alternate, provides a free but not controlled-access route through the towns bypassed by the Turnpike with only a  speed limit.

Route description
The turnpike begins by branching off US-412 east of the Grand River in Mayes County. The turnpike carries US-412 for its entire length; the old alignment of US-412, which was also at one time State Highway 33, is now US-412 Alternate. The Cherokee Turnpike runs within a close distance of US-412 Alternate for its entire length. The turnpike generally varies only a few degrees from true east–west throughout its entire route.

The turnpike's first exit is a diamond interchange with State Highway 82 just south of Locust Grove. From this point, the road travels  without another exit. During this interval, the highway crosses from Mayes into Delaware County. Just after crossing the county line, the Cherokee has its second exit, again meeting US-412 Alternate southeast of Rose. This second exit is a partial cloverleaf with loop ramps in the northwest, northeast, and southwest quadrants.

Continuing east, the turnpike passes through a barrier toll plaza. The final exit, another  from the US-412 Alternate exit, occurs north of Kansas, Oklahoma at US-59/SH-10, which is another diamond interchange. After this interchange, US-412 Alternate crosses over the turnpike with no interchange. The median gradually widens again as US-412 Alternate, now concurrent with US-59, crosses under the westbound lanes and begins running through the median. The eastbound lanes eventually merge with US-59/US-412 Alternate. This marks the eastern terminus of both the Cherokee Turnpike and US-412 Alternate. US-59 and mainline US-412 continue east toward West Siloam Springs, Oklahoma, where they split, and US-412 crosses the state line into Siloam Springs, Arkansas.

History

The Cherokee Turnpike resulted from the same 1987 compromise between urban and rural legislators that resulted in the Kilpatrick, Creek, and Chickasaw Turnpikes. The turnpike opened to traffic in 1991.

Services
An Oklahoma Tourism Information Center is located on the turnpike near the Kansas exit,  from the Arkansas–Oklahoma state line. Free coffee is available at the tourism center.

Law enforcement along the Cherokee Turnpike is provided by Oklahoma Highway Patrol Troop XD, a special troop assigned to the turnpike.

Tolls
A two-axle vehicle currently pays $3.25 (PikePass holders pay less) to drive the full length of the Turnpike. This is equivalent of a toll of 8¢ per mile. Drivers in vehicles with more than two axles, such as truckers, pay higher tolls.

Tolls are collected for eastbound traffic upon exiting at Locust Grove and Leach, and entry at Kansas. Westbound traffic must pay toll upon exit at Kansas and entry at Leach and Locust Grove. All traffic passing through the barrier toll west of the Kansas exit must pay toll, regardless of direction.

Exit list

See also
 
 
 Oklahoma Turnpike Authority
 Pikepass

References

External links

Cherokee Turnpike Toll/Fares Chart - Oklahoma Turnpike Authority

Toll roads in Oklahoma
Transport infrastructure completed in 1991
1991 establishments in Oklahoma
Transportation in Mayes County, Oklahoma
Transportation in Delaware County, Oklahoma
U.S. Route 412